Elder Peak is a peak at the north margin of Chapman Snowfield in the Churchill Mountains of Antarctica. It was named after William C. Elder, a United States Geological Survey topographic engineer with the Topo North – Topo South survey expedition in these mountains, 1961–62.

References 

Mountains of Oates Land